Yamaguchi Choseichi is a rockfill dam located in Fukuoka Prefecture in Japan. The dam is used for water supply. The catchment area of the dam is 1.4 km2. The dam impounds about 26  ha of land when full and can store 4000 thousand cubic meters of water. The construction of the dam was started on 1986 and completed in 1998.

References

Dams in Fukuoka Prefecture
1998 establishments in Japan